Saptami is the seventh day (tithi) of the fortnight (paksha) in the Hindu lunar calendar.

Occasions 
 Ratha Saptami: Vishnu, in his form as Surya, is usually worshiped on this occasion. Usually, Rathasapthami begins in households with a purification bath by holding a few bilva leaves on one's head while bathing and chanting a verse that is supposed to invoke the benevolence of the deity in all that one takes up the rest of the year. It also involves doing a puja with the ritual 'Naivedyam', flowers and fruits.
 Navaratri: The seventh Day of the Navaratri Kalaratri Puja takes place.
 The birthday of Jalaram Bapa falls on Saptami Shukla paksha of Kartika and is celebrated as Jalaram Jayanti.

References

07